Carson Lee "Skeeter" Bigbee (March 31, 1895 – October 17, 1964) was an American outfielder in Major League Baseball who played his entire career with the Pittsburgh Pirates.  He was born in Lebanon, Oregon, and attended the University of Oregon.

Bigbee's brother Lyle also played Major League Baseball.

In 1147 games over 11 seasons, Bigbee batted .287 (1205-for-4192) with 629 runs scored, 17 home runs and 324 RBI.

In 1926, Bigbee was released along with Pirates pitcher Babe Adams after supporting the removal of meddlesome former manager and part-owner Fred Clarke from the team's dugout.

After his playing career ended, he coached the Muskegon Lassies and Springfield Sallies of the All-American Girls Professional Baseball League.

Bigbee died at the age of 69 in Portland, Oregon.  He was interred at the Willamette National Cemetery in Portland.

See also
List of Major League Baseball single-game hits leaders
List of Major League Baseball players who spent their entire career with one franchise

References

External links

Retrosheet.org
Carson Bigbee

Major League Baseball outfielders
Pittsburgh Pirates players
Tacoma Tigers players
Seattle Indians players
Portland Beavers players
Los Angeles Angels (minor league) players
Oregon Ducks baseball players
All-American Girls Professional Baseball League managers
Baseball players from Oregon
People from Lebanon, Oregon
Burials at Willamette National Cemetery
1895 births
1964 deaths